Stephen Full (born November 13, 1969) is an American actor and comedian, known for his voice role as Stan on the Disney Channel show Dog with a Blog, and acting role as Ash on I'm in the Band, which aired on Disney Channel's sister network, Disney XD.

Early life
Full was born in Chicago, Illinois on November 13, 1969.

Career
Full guest starred in NBC's Las Vegas for two episodes and Disney Channel's Hannah Montana.

He and the other cast members of I'm in the Band appeared in a cross-over episode of The Suite Life on Deck ("Weasels on Deck").

He also is the voice of Stan, a talking dog with a big heart, in the Disney television show Dog With A Blog.

He appeared in "Overkill", in season 2 of ABC's Castle and appeared in "Murder Sings the Blues", in season 3 of CSI: NY.

He guest-starred on Best Friends Whenever as Ray, a pizza delivery man.

He guest-starred on iCarly as a customer on the "iOwe You" episode at Chili My Bowl.

Full guest-starred on  NCIS season 16 episode 14 "Once Upon A Tim" as Mr. Lewis, Tim McGee's teacher.

Personal life
Full was married to actress Annie Wersching from 2009 until her death in 2023. They have three sons together.

Filmography

Film

Television

References

External links 
 
 poptower bio

1969 births
Male actors from Chicago
American male comedians
American male television actors
Living people
21st-century American male actors
20th-century American male actors
Comedians from Illinois
20th-century American comedians
21st-century American comedians